Rimi Sen (born Subhamitra Sen on 21 September 1981) is an Indian actress and producer who appears in Hindi, Telugu, and Bengali films. Sen debuted as child actress in the 1996 Bengali film Damu. She made her debut as a lead actress in 2002, in the Telugu film Nee Thodu Kavali. In 2003, she made her Hindi film debut in the comedy film Hungama for which she was nominated at the Filmfare Awards for Best Female Debut. Subsequently, she appeared in several successful films including Baghban (2003), Dhoom (2004), Garam Masala (2005), Kyon Ki (2005), Phir Hera Pheri (2006) and Golmaal: Fun Unlimited (2006). She also participated in the reality television show Bigg Boss in 2015.

Early life
Sen was born as Subhamitra Sen into a Bengali Baidya family Calcutta, West Bengal.  She graduated with a degree in commerce from the University of Calcutta.

Career

Since childhood, Sen dreamt of becoming an actress. She lived at Jyotish Roy Road, New Alipore, Kolkata with her mother. She did her schooling from Vidya Bharati New Alipore near Mint. After completing her studies, she persuaded her mother to accompany her to Mumbai. She later said that she wasn't encouraged by anyone in her family except by her grandfather. After doing the rounds, she got into ads including one Coca-Cola ad with Aamir Khan.

Sen made her debut as a lead actress in the Telugu movie Nee Thodu Kavali. Her debut Hindi film, Vijay Galani's Hungama was released in 2003. It was a comedy film, in which she co-starred with Akshaye Khanna, Aftab Shivdasani and Paresh Rawal.

She followed it with appearances in big-budget movies such as Dhoom (2004), Kyon Ki (2005), Garam Masala (2005) and Golmaal (2006). Sen also did a cameo in the 2006 film Dhoom 2, and she followed it with Johnny Gaddaar, alongside newcomer actor Neil Nitin Mukesh. In 2008, she appeared in De Taali and in 2009, Sankat City and Horn Ok Please. All three of these films were box office disasters. After these films, her career declined.

She further appeared in the films Thank You and Shagird in 2011. Both failed to do well. In 2015, she participated in the reality show Bigg Boss.

Sen has produced a film, Budhia Singh - Born to Run. She changed her screen name, Rimi, to her real name, Subhamitra Sen for her production venture.

Reality TV
Sen was a celebrity contestant in the ninth season of the Indian version of the reality TV show Big Brother, Bigg Boss. It aired in October 2015. Sen entered the house with Suyyash Rai as her partner for the show; however, her pairing was revised on Day 5, when Rochelle Rao was chosen as her new partner. She was evicted after staying in the house for 7.5 weeks.

Filmography

Awards and nominations

References

External links

Living people
1981 births
21st-century Indian actresses
Indian film actresses
Actresses in Bengali cinema
Actresses in Hindi cinema
Actresses in Telugu cinema
Actresses from Kolkata
Actresses from Mumbai
Bigg Boss (Hindi TV series) contestants